Ekkehardt Belle (18 May 1954  – 31 January 2022) was a German television actor best known for his role as David Balfour in the 1979 HTV production of  opposite David McCallum.

He played several roles in the popular TV series Derrick during the 1980s. He was also known for dubbing the role of Robert Baratheon in the German dub of Game of Thrones. He died in Munich on 31 January 2022 at the age of 67.

Selected filmography
 Slaughterhouse-Five (1972)
 Julia (1974)
 Les Faucheurs de marguerites (1974, TV series)
  (1975, TV film)
 Victory March (1976)
  (1978, TV miniseries)
 She's 19 and Ready (1979)
 Derrick - Season 7, Episode 5: "Ein tödlicher Preis" (1980, TV)
 Derrick - Season 9, Episode 4: "Die Fahrt nach Lindau" (1982, TV)
 Derrick - Season 9, Episode 6: "Das Alibi" (1982, TV)
 Nesthäkchen (1983, TV miniseries)
 Derrick - Season 11, Episode 4: "Drei atemlose Tage" (1984, TV)
 Derrick - Season 12, Episode 2: "Gregs Trompete" (1985, TV)

References

External links

1954 births
2022 deaths
20th-century German male actors
German male film actors
German male television actors
People from Rhein-Kreis Neuss